State Route 271 (SR 271) is a  east–west state highway located in the west-central part of the U.S. state of Georgia. Its route is within Schley and Sumter counties.

Route description
SR 271 begins at an intersection with US 19/SR 3 southeast of Ellaville. The route heads east, and then northeast, to the unincorporated community of LaCrosse, where it intersects Lacrosse Road and a Norfolk Southern Railway line. The highway continues northeast, and curves to the east until it intersects Schley County Road 19. After that, SR 271 continues heading east, and then curves to the northeast until it meets its eastern terminus at SR 228 (Ellaville Street) in Andersonville.

History

SR 272 was established in 1950 along the same alignment as it runs today. By 1957, the whole length of the highway was paved.

Major intersections

See also

References

External links

271
Transportation in Schley County, Georgia
Transportation in Sumter County, Georgia